Jonathan Kerner (born June 6, 1974) is an American former professional basketball player. After graduating from St. Pius X Catholic High School, the 6'11" center attended East Carolina University and Florida State University. He played one game for the NBA's Orlando Magic in 1999 while also appearing in the EuroLeague with CSKA Moscow in 2001. He signed with the New York Knicks in October 2000 and originally made the 15 man roster. After spending the first month on the injury list, he was waived on 27 November to make room for recently injured Charlie Ward.

References

External links
NBA statistics at basketball-reference.com
EuroLeage statistics at euroleague.net

1974 births
Living people
American expatriate basketball people in Japan
American expatriate basketball people in Russia
American men's basketball players
Basketball players from Atlanta
Centers (basketball)
Columbus Riverdragons players
East Carolina Pirates men's basketball players
Florida State Seminoles men's basketball players
Greenville Groove players
Orlando Magic players
PBC CSKA Moscow players
Quad City Thunder players
Rockford Lightning players
Sioux Falls Skyforce (CBA) players
Sun Rockers Shibuya players
Undrafted National Basketball Association players